Villaverde Bajo-Cruce is a station on Line 3 of the Madrid Metro. It is located in fare Zone A.

It should not be confused with the homonymous station of Cercanías Madrid, as there is no direct access between the two stations.

History
The station was a proposed stop on the Madrid Metro Line 3 extension which took place during 2006. The station eventually opened to the public on 21 April 2007 along with other stations on the extension of the line. This has allowed the area to connect well with the central city of Madrid.

References 

Line 3 (Madrid Metro) stations
Railway stations in Spain opened in 2007
Buildings and structures in Villaverde District, Madrid